is a Japanese actor, martial artist and writer with extensive training in Shindō jinen-ryū Karate, Kendo, Judo, Iaido, Kobudo, Aikido and Ninjutsu. A former All Japan Karate Champion, he gained popularity as an actor during the 1980s, often playing ninjas. He starred in a trilogy of martial arts ninja films produced by Cannon Films (Enter the Ninja, Revenge of the Ninja and Ninja III: The Domination), before starring in the primetime television series The Master. His work helped establish ninjas in popular culture, leading to a "ninja boom" or "ninjamania" during the early-to-mid-1980s.

Life and career
At the age of 19, Kosugi left Japan to study and reside in Los Angeles where he earned a bachelor's degree in Economics at CSULA. At the same time, he consistently improved his martial arts skills while learning a wide variety of styles, such as Chinese Xing Yi Quan, Korean taekwondo and Japanese Shitō-ryū and Shotokan-ryū karate.

He is the father of Kane Kosugi and Shane Kosugi, who are both actors and martial artists, and Ayeesha Kosugi, a former senior member of the women's golf team at the University of Las Vegas. After taking a hiatus from film, he started a taiko group in California. In Japan, he also ran an internationally oriented group of martial arts acting schools known as the Sho Kosugi Institute. He currently resides in Los Angeles. Films in which Kosugi's sons perform alongside their father include Revenge of the Ninja, Pray for Death, Black Eagle and Journey of Honor (A.K.A. Kabuto, Shogun Mayeda and Shogun Warrior).

In 2009, Sho made a comeback to films playing the lead villain of Ozunu in the action thriller Ninja Assassin opposite K-pop star and actor Rain.

Filmography

Films

Television

Home videos

Stage

Video games

Bibliography

Non-Fiction

Fiction

Notes

References

External links

Sho Kosugi: The Ninja (archived)
Find me a Ninja

1948 births
Living people
20th-century Japanese male actors
21st-century Japanese male actors
American male actors of Japanese descent
American male film actors
American male karateka
American film actors of Asian descent
California State University, Los Angeles alumni
Japanese emigrants to the United States
Japanese male film actors
Japanese male karateka
Male actors from Tokyo
Male actors from Los Angeles
People from Los Angeles
Xingyiquan practitioners
Taiko players